Okimoto is a Japanese surname. Notable people with the surname include:

 Dana Okimoto (1966–), American Branch Davidian
 Jerry T. Okimoto (1924–1998), a Japanese-American artist
 Kevin Okimoto, a Hawaiian singer and musician
, a Japanese professional wrestler
 Poliana Okimoto (1983–), Brazilian swimmer
 Val Okimoto, American politician

Okimoto is also a masculine Japanese given name. Notable people with the name include:
, head to the Mōri clan

Japanese-language surnames
Japanese masculine given names